Volkan Bekçi (born 15 February 1987) is a Turkish footballer who plays for Beylerbeyi S.K. on loan from Galatasaray S.K.

He is a midfielder and wears the 61 shirt which is the car number plate location code for Trabzon where his parents are from.

References

1987 births
Living people
People from Vakfıkebir
Turkish footballers
Turkey youth international footballers
Galatasaray S.K. footballers
Gaziantepspor footballers
Altay S.K. footballers
Beylerbeyi S.K. footballers

Association football midfielders